Park Woo-sang ( born May 30, 1985 in Seoul) is a retired South Korean professional ice hockey center.  He played for the South Korean national team at the 2007 Asian Winter Games, and scored 4 goals. He played three seasons for Anyang Halla of ALH. On November 1, 2011 Park signed a 1-year deal with the Coventry Blaze of the EIHL, becoming the first Korean native to play in the British league.

References

External links
 

1985 births
HL Anyang players
Asian Games silver medalists for South Korea
Asian Games bronze medalists for South Korea
Asian Games medalists in ice hockey
Coventry Blaze players
Ice hockey players at the 2007 Asian Winter Games
Ice hockey players at the 2011 Asian Winter Games
Ice hockey players at the 2017 Asian Winter Games
Ice hockey players at the 2018 Winter Olympics
Ice hockey people from Seoul
Living people
Medalists at the 2007 Asian Winter Games
Medalists at the 2011 Asian Winter Games
Medalists at the 2017 Asian Winter Games
Olympic ice hockey players of South Korea
South Korean ice hockey centres
South Korean expatriate sportspeople in England